D-wave may refer to:

 D-Wave Systems, a quantum computing company
 D-Wave Two, a quantum computer
 D wave, an electronic wave function of the d atomic orbital